Małgorzata Pieczyńska (born 4 May 1960) is a Polish film and television actress.

Personal life 
Pieczyńska was born in Warsaw. Her first husband was a fellow actor Andrzej Pieczyński. After they divorced, she married Gabriel Wróblewski, with whom she emigrated to Sweden in late 1980s. They have a son Wiktor, and live in Stockholm. She is fluent in Polish and Swedish, and also speaks Russian and French well.

External links

Polish film actresses
Polish expatriates in Sweden
Actresses from Warsaw
1960 births
Living people
Polish stage actresses
Aleksander Zelwerowicz National Academy of Dramatic Art in Warsaw alumni
Polish emigrants to Sweden